John Powell House is a historic home located in East Fallowfield Township, Chester County, Pennsylvania, United States. The house was built about 1796, and is a two-story, five bay, stuccoed stone vernacular Federal style dwelling. It has a gable roof and a full width front porch.

It was added to the National Register of Historic Places in 1985.

References

Houses on the National Register of Historic Places in Pennsylvania
Federal architecture in Pennsylvania
Houses completed in 1796
Houses in Chester County, Pennsylvania
National Register of Historic Places in Chester County, Pennsylvania
1796 establishments in Pennsylvania